Curt Hansen (born August 14, 1987) is an American actor and singer.

Early life
He was born in 1987 in Hartford, Wisconsin and is a native actor, singer and dancer. Hansen graduated from Hartford Union High School in Hartford, Wisconsin in 2005.

Career
He starred in the National Tour of Kinky Boots in the role of Charlie. He also performed in the first national tour of Wicked in the role of Fiyero.  In 2010, Hansen was the Gabe understudy/cover in the Tony award-winning Broadway musical Next to Normal and continued in the role of Gabe in the First National Tour of the show through 2010–2011. December 2012 he starred in the Pasadena Playhouse's A Snow White Christmas with Neil Patrick Harris and Ariana Grande. February 2013 found Hansen in Louisville starring as Mike in Todd Almond's musical Girlfriend.  Curt was a member of the final cast of Hairspray on Broadway, as well as other Broadway readings and workshops. He also performed in the Mark Taper Forum production of Jason Robert Brown's acclaimed musical Parade. He studied with the BFA Musical Theatre program at the University of Wisconsin–Stevens Point. Hansen took over the role of Fiyero from Ashley Parker Angel in the Broadway production of Wicked, beginning on July 16, 2018. He departed the show on September 9, 2018, and was succeeded by Ryan McCartan. Since 2019, he has been performing the role of Fiyero in the musical's second national tour.

Filmography

Stage

References

External links

1987 births
American male stage actors
Living people
People from Hartford, Wisconsin
University of Wisconsin–Stevens Point alumni
Male actors from Wisconsin
Musicians from Wisconsin
American male television actors
21st-century American male actors